Kiss Serious is the second album by American singer Chico DeBarge. It was released by Motown Records in 1987 in the United States.

Critical reception

AllMusic editor Ed Hogan called the album "a worthy follow-up. With most tracks produced by one-time Prince & the Revolution bassist Brownmark, it's steeped in an '80s-era Minneapolis sound. The funk is poppin' on "I've Been Watching You," "Will You Be Mine," "Don't Move So Fast," and the title track second single."

Track listing

Notes
 signifies associate producer(s)

Charts

Release history

References

Chico DeBarge albums
1987 albums
Motown albums